Gustavo Pereira Ribeiro (born 27 March 2001) is a Portuguese professional skateboarder. He won the bronze medal at the 2019 World Skateboarding Championship on street skateboarding and won the Street League Skateboarding super crown in 2022.

Early life 
Ribeiro got his first skateboard at the age of four as his uncle Christmas gift. Two years later, he got sponsored by Bana, a local surf & skate shop, along with his twin brother, Gabriel Ribeiro. Days later they competed at Bana's local competition and both finished on top three, with Gabriel winning the contest and Gustavo placing third, in their first ever competition. The brothers kept pushing each other and did a family trip to Switzerland to compete in their first ever international competition. Gabriel won the competition, and Gustavo placed third. Since then they started competing and dedicating themselves to the sport. With only 14 years old he started travelling alone to international competitions.

Career 

In 12 November 2017 he won Tampa Am, one of the biggest worldwide amateur competitions in street skateboarding, that serves as an introduction of new talented skaters in the skateboarding scene. The competition is ranked below the famous competition Tampa Pro.

In May 2021 he suffered a shoulder dislocation and missed the 2021 World Championships in Rome, Italy.

After almost two months of recovery he represented Portugal at the men's street competition of the 2020 Summer Olympics. During the qualification round he suffered from shoulder pain and finished last on the final round, getting a debut 8th place and an olympic diploma.

In 28 August 2021 he got his first ever win in a SLS competition, winning the first out of three stops of the SLS Men's Championship Tour in Salt Lake City, United States. This was his first competition after his full recovery from an eventual shoulder surgery after his recurrent shoulder injuries.

Personal life 
His twin brother, Gabriel Ribeiro is an amateur skateboarder with hopes of following Gustavo's steps. Their father Paulo Ribeiro is currently their coach.

In 2019, he paused his secondary school studies to become a full time professional skateboarder.

He dated Portuguese YouTuber and internet celebrity Sofia Barbosa, from 2019 to 2020.

His skateboarding idols are Nyjah Huston and Shane O'Neill. His sports idol is Portuguese football player Cristiano Ronaldo.

Notes

References

2001 births
Living people
Olympic skateboarders of Portugal
Sportspeople from Cascais
Portuguese skateboarders
Skateboarders at the 2020 Summer Olympics
X Games athletes